Dansiea is a genus of flowering plants belonging to the family Combretaceae.

Its native range is Northeastern Australia.

The genus name honours Samuel Justin Dansie (1927–2012), an Australian forester and plant collector, it was published in Austrobaileya Vol.1 on page 385 in 1981.

Species known:

Dansiea elliptica 
Dansiea grandiflora

References

Combretaceae
Myrtales genera
Taxa named by Norman Brice Byrnes